I Killed the Count is a 1937 play by Alec Coppel. Its success launched Coppel's career.

1937 London production

Cast
Eric Maturin as Count Victor Mattoni
Athole Stewart as Viscount Sorrington
Alec Clunes as Detective Raines
Anthony Hollesas Samuel Diamond
Kathleen Harrison as Polly
George Merritt as Divisional Inspector Davidson
Meriel Forbes as Renee La Lune
Barbara Francis as Louise Rogers
Edward Petley as Johnson
Hugh E. Wright as Mullet
Anthony Bushell as Bernard K. Froy
John Oxford as PC Clifton
Frederick Cooper as Martin.

1942 Broadway production

The play was produced on Broadway in 1942.

1939 novelisation
A novelisation of the play was published in 1939.

1939 film adaptation

Radio adaptations
The play was adapted for Australian radio in 1941. Max Afford did the adaptation.

It was also adapted for BBC radio in 1945.

1948 BBC TV adaptation
A second adaptation I Killed the Count was made by the BBC in 1948.

1956 ITV TV adaptation
The play was adapted by ITV in 1956.

1957 Alfred Hitchcock Presents version
The play was also adapted as a three-parter on TV's Alfred Hitchcock Presents.

1959 Belgian TV version
The play was adapted for Belgian TV in 1959.

References

External links
 
 
 
 
 
 
 Who is Guilty? review at Motion Picture Daily
 Who is Guilty? review at Film Daily
 

1937 plays
West End plays
Plays by Alec Coppel
British plays adapted into films